The Blue Swords was an international figure skating competition in East Germany. First time in 1984 the competition was organised only for junior skaters. The 1987 edition with participants from twenty countries was held November 11–14 in  East-Berlin. Medals were awarded in the disciplines of men's singles, ladies' singles and pair skating.

Men

Ladies

Pairs

References
German Newspaper "Neues Deutschland" Archiv, 16.11.1987 / German Figure Skating Magazin "Pirouette" 01/1988

Blue Swords
1987 in figure skating